Michael Daniel Dawson (October 16, 1953 – March 14, 2008) was an American football defensive end in the National Football League (NFL) who was selected by the St. Louis Cardinals in the 1st round (22nd overall) of the 1976 NFL Draft. A 6'4", 256 lb. defensive end from the University of Arizona, Dawson played in nine NFL seasons from 1976 to 1984 for the Cardinals, the Detroit Lions and the Kansas City Chiefs.

References
Obituary

1953 births
2008 deaths
People from Dorking
Sportspeople from Surrey
American football defensive ends
Arizona Wildcats football players
St. Louis Cardinals (football) players
Detroit Lions players
Kansas City Chiefs players
Players of American football from Tucson, Arizona
English players of American football
Tucson High School alumni